The Yang di-Pertua Negeri Sarawak, also known as the Governor of Sarawak, is the ceremonial head of state of Sarawak. The Yang di-Pertua Negeri is styled .
 
The official residence of the Governor is The Astana, located on the north bank of the Sarawak River in Kuching.

The current office bearer, Abdul Taib Mahmud, was sworn in on 1 March 2014. He received the credentials as the new Yang di-Pertua Negeri on 28 February, and took the oath of office on the following day. He was re-appointed as Governor on 28 February 2018 for the 2nd term.

Appointment 
The office of the Governor is established by article 1(1) of the Constitution of Sarawak. The position is appointed by the Yang di-Pertuan Agong after consultation with the Premier. Every Governor is appointed for a term of 4-years. However, the King reserves the power to extend his term of appointment.

The Governor has neither deputy nor assistant. However, in event of his inability to govern the state due to illness, absence or any other cause, the King reserves the power to appoint a person to exercise the function of the Governor.

Functions, powers and privileges 
Many functions and powers of the King – at the federal level – are delegated to the Governor at the state level – like the other Rulers of States. The Governor, however, has no power and function towards the Judiciary. Most of them are appointed after consultation with the Chief Minister, except in appointing the Chief Minister. The same process occurred during dismissal of an office bearer.

The Constitution also describes powers of the Governor in the State Legislative Assembly. All bills must be assented by the Governor in 30 days after a bill passed. The Governor also has to address the Assembly annually.

List of Yang di-Pertua Negeri of Sarawak

Notes 
1. Abang Muhammad Salahuddin was the first Yang di-Pertua Negeri to serve twice as governor of Sarawak state.

References

See also 
 Yang di-Pertua Negeri

 
Sarawak
Lists of political office-holders in Malaysia
1963 establishments in Malaysia